, also known as Once In a Blue Moon in Japan, is a 2011 Japanese comedy mystery film directed by Kōki Mitani.

Plot
Emi Hosho, a third-rate lawyer without much of a future, is tasked with defending Goro Yabe, a man arrested for the murder of his wife. Without much hope of winning, Yabe proclaims his innocence, saying that he was under sleep paralysis at the time of the murder. Emi heads to the inn where Yabe stayed and encounters the ghost of fallen samurai Rokubei Sarashina, who claims he was the one holding Yabe in sleep paralysis. Rokubei is brought to the court as a witness. However, the prosecution denies the existence of the occult, asserting that Rokubei's testimony is inadmissible in court. So begins the struggle to prove Yabe's innocence.

Cast
 Eri Fukatsu - Emi Hosho (lawyer) 
 Toshiyuki Nishida - Rokubei Sarashina (fallen samurai) 
 Hiroshi Abe - Yu Hayami (lawyer) 
 Kiichi Nakai - Tooru Osano (prosecutor) 
 Yūko Takeuchi - Suzuko Yabe (murder victim), Fuuko Hino (sister of the deceased) 
 Tadanobu Asano - Kenichi Kido (historian, Rokubei's descendant)
 Tsuyoshi Kusanagi - Teruo Hosho (Emi's father)
 Fumiyo Kohinata - Jouji Danda

References

External links
  - 
 

2010s comedy mystery films
2011 films
Films directed by Kōki Mitani
Films with screenplays by Kôki Mitani
Films produced by Kazutoshi Wadakura
Japanese comedy mystery films
Japanese courtroom films
2010s Japanese films
2010s Japanese-language films